Let Not One Devil Cross the Bridge is a 1968 Finnish anthology comedy film directed by Matti Kassila. The film is an ensemble divided into three independent stories, based on the ideas of the actual frame story, where the people who took part in the film design meeting during the get-together held at evening. The film is starring Maija Karhi, Pentti Siimes, Helge Herala and Toivo Mäkelä.

Director Kassila returned to film directing after a five-year hiatus. The film was completed at a time when Finnish television had begun to take audiences away from cinemas, which is why Kassila wanted to use this film to comment on the crisis in the Finnish film industry.

The film's audience success was the weakest in 1968, even though it was effectively marketed, and it made big losses, making it the box-office bomb.<ref>Äl' yli päästä perhanaa - National Audiovisual Institute, Finna.fi (in Finnish)</ref> In the television show Kinoklubi, where directors Matti Kassila and Markku Pölönen and producer Markus Selin listed their own failed films and the reasons for the failure, Kassila considered Let Not One Devil Cross the Bridge to be one of his worst films ever made.

See also
 Kummeli: Stories''

References

External links

1968 films
Finnish black-and-white films
1960s Finnish-language films
Films directed by Matti Kassila
Finnish comedy films
Anthology films